Igor Žofčák (born 10 April 1983) is a Slovak professional footballer who currently plays for Zemplín Michalovce.

Honours

Ružomberok
Slovak Super Liga (1): 2005–06
Slovak Cup (1): 2005–06

Sparta Praha
Gambrinus liga (1): 2009–10

Slovan Bratislava
Slovak Super Liga (3): 2010–11, 2012–13, 2013–14
Slovak Cup (2): 2010–11, 2012–13
Slovak Super Cup (1): 2014

Nyíregyháza Spartacus FC
Nemzeti Bajnokság III, Eastern Conference (1): 2016

International
UEFA European Under-19 Football Championship: Third place (2002)

External links
ŠK Slovan profile 
 

1983 births
Living people
People from Michalovce
Sportspeople from the Košice Region
Association football wingers
Slovak footballers
Slovak expatriate footballers
Slovakia international footballers
Slovakia youth international footballers
MFK Zemplín Michalovce players
MFK Ružomberok players
AC Sparta Prague players
FK Jablonec players
ŠK Slovan Bratislava players
Nyíregyháza Spartacus FC players
Slovak Super Liga players
Czech First League players
Nemzeti Bajnokság I players
Nemzeti Bajnokság III players
Expatriate footballers in the Czech Republic
Slovak expatriate sportspeople in the Czech Republic
Expatriate footballers in Hungary
Slovak expatriate sportspeople in Hungary